The LA to the Moon Tour was the fourth headlining concert tour by American singer Lana Del Rey, in support of her fifth studio album and fourth major-label studio album, Lust for Life (2017). The tour began on January 5, 2018, at the Target Center in Minneapolis, and visited cities across North America, South America, Oceania and Europe. Originally scheduled to end September 7, 2018, in Lehavot HaBashan, it ended early in Budapest on August 10, 2018, due to protest associated with the ongoing Israeli–Palestinian conflict.

Background 
Del Rey's fifth studio album, Lust for Life was officially released worldwide on July 21, 2017. During the months leading up to the album's release, fans and press speculated whether or not Del Rey would embark on a headlining concert tour in support of the album, as she did not for her previous release, Honeymoon. In an interview for Beats 1 on July 12, 2017, Zane Lowe asked Del Rey if she planned to go on a world tour and she seemed unsure, but during the following months Del Rey began to announce various one-off promotional concerts across the United Kingdom and United States. The promotional tour took place from July to October 2017, and consisted of concerts at intimate venues in London, cities in California and New York City, as well as shows at the Echo Arena Liverpool and the SSE Hydro in the United Kingdom.

On August 19, 2017, Del Rey confirmed in a video via Instagram that she would be embarking on an official world tour in support of Lust for Life, as her first official headlining concert tour since The Endless Summer Tour in 2015, which was in support of Ultraviolence. Del Rey teased many details of the tour during the following weeks, she informed fans of what continents she would be visiting and how to purchase tickets through presale.

The first dates for the LA to the Moon Tour were eventually announced on September 27, 2017, with a leg of North American dates, and on the same day Del Rey announced that she would be appearing at various South American festivals. Tickets for the North American shows became available for presale on September 29, followed by general sale on October 2. The North American leg is supported by American singer Jhené Aiko and Colombian-American singer Kali Uchis. Australian and European dates for the tour were announced on October 16, 2017.

On January 16, 2018, it was announced that American singer Børns, whom Del Rey had recently collaborated with on two tracks for his second studio album Blue Madonna, would be joining Del Rey as the opening act for the Australian leg of the tour.

Development and stage
In an interview with MTV during October 2017, Del Rey stated that she was working to create a stage design for the tour that incorporates "lots of senses", and beach themed projections with "beautiful structures that move in and out of the stage to give it a classic feeling". The stage design, designed by Jason Ardizzone-West, was revealed once the tour began on January 5, 2018. The stage features an array of beach-themed props and is backed by a large screen displaying visuals designed by Storme Whitby-Grubb. Terence Cawley of The Boston Globe described the set-up as a "microcosm of  [Del Rey's] beloved California" with a display of rock formations, palm trees, and beach chairs. Reed Fischer of GoMN similarly described the stage as "pure Los Angeles", suiting the title of the tour, "LA to the Moon", with "projections of crashing waves, a fast-moving highway, and a sun-drenched swimming pool danced on the stage floor throughout the night".

Set list
This set list is representative of the show on January 5, 2018, in Minneapolis, Minnesota. It does not represent all dates throughout the tour.

 "13 Beaches" 
 "Pretty When You Cry"
 "Cherry" 
 "Born to Die"
 "Blue Jeans"
 "White Mustang"
 "National Anthem" 
 "When the World Was at War We Kept Dancing"
 "Music to Watch Boys To"
 "Lust for Life"
 "Change" / "Black Beauty" / "Young and Beautiful"
 "Ride" 
 "Video Games"
 "Love"
 "Ultraviolence"
 "Summertime Sadness"
 "Serial Killer"
 "Off to the Races"

Shows

Cancelled shows

Notes

References

External links
LA to the Moon Tour on the Lana Del Rey Official Website

2018 concert tours
Lana Del Rey concert tours
Concert tours of North America
Concert tours of South America
Concert tours of Oceania
Concert tours of Europe
Concert tours of the United States
Concert tours of Canada
Concert tours of Australia
Concert tours of Italy
Concert tours of Germany
Concert tours of Belgium
Concert tours of Spain